The 2013–14 Taça da Liga was the seventh edition of the Taça da Liga, a Portuguese football knockout competition organized by the Portuguese League for Professional Football (LPFP). It was contested by the 33 clubs competing in the 2013–14 Primeira Liga and 2013–14 Segunda Liga, the top two tiers and only professional leagues in Portuguese football. The competition began in July 2013 with first-round matches and concluded on 7 May 2014, with the final at the Estádio Dr. Magalhães Pessoa in Leiria, where Benfica defeated Rio Ave 2–0 to win a fifth Taça da Liga title.

Format 
The competition format for the 2013–14 edition consists of three rounds plus a knockout phase. In the first round, only teams competing in the 2013–14 Segunda Liga (excluding reserve teams from Primeira Liga clubs) take part. The seventeen teams are drawn into four groups (three with four teams and one with five), where each team plays against the others in a single round-robin format. The group winners and runners-up advance to the second round.

In the second round, the eight teams that qualified from the previous round are joined by the six Primeira Liga teams placed ninth to 14th in the previous season and the two teams promoted to 2013–14 Primeira Liga. Two-legged home-and-away fixtures are played between Segunda Liga teams qualifying from the first round and Primeira Liga teams entering this round, and the winner advances to the third round.

The third round features the eight winners of the previous round the remaining eight Primeira Liga teams, ranked 1st to 8th in the previous season. Similarly to the first round, the sixteen teams are drawn into four groups of four teams, according to a seeding based on their classification in the previous season. Each team plays against the other three in a single round-robin format, and only the group winners advance to the knockout phase. The knockout phase consists of semi-finals and one final, both decided in one-legged fixtures. The final match is played at a neutral venue.

Teams 
The 33 teams competing in the two professional tiers of Portuguese football for the 2013–14 season are eligible to participate in this competition. For Primeira Liga teams, the final league position in the previous season determines if they enter in the second or third round of the Taça da Liga.

Key
Nth: League position in the 2012–13 season
P1: Promoted to the Primeira Liga
P2: Promoted to the Segunda Liga
R1: Relegated to the Segunda Liga

Notes
 Sporting da Covilhã finished 20th in the 2012–13 Segunda Liga, in position to be relegated to the National Championship for the 2013–14 season. However, as Naval – which finished 18th in the Segunda Liga – were unable to fulfill the LPFP requirements mandatory for entry in professional competitions, they were further relegated to the National Championship and Covilhã was invited to take Naval's place.

Schedule 
All draws were held at the LPFP headquarters in Porto.

First round

Group A

Group B

Group C

Group D

Second round
The draw for the second round was held on 10 September 2013. The sixteen teams involved in this draw were divided in two pots: one pot contained the eight teams progressing from the first round, and the other pot included the six teams that finished 9th–14th in the 2012–13 Primeira Liga and the two teams promoted to the top flight from the 2012–13 Segunda Liga. The first-leg matches were played on 25 September, 9 and 12–13 October 2013. The second-leg matches were played on 13 and 30 October, and 16–17 November 2013.

Third round
The draw for the third round was held on 20 November 2013. The sixteen teams taking part in this draw were divided in four pots: the first pot contained the teams placed 1st–4th in the 2012–13 Primeira Liga, while the second pot had the teams placed 5th–8th. The third pot included the four second-round winners with the best placing in their respective leagues in the 2012–13 season, and the fourth pot had the remaining second-round winners. 
Each group contained four teams, one from each pot, and was contested in a single round-robin format, with each team playing at least one match at home. The matches took place on 29–30 December 2013, 14–16 and 25–26 January 2014. The group winners advanced to the semi-finals.

Tiebreakers
The teams are ranked according to points (3 points for a win, 1 point for a tie, 0 points for a loss). If two or more teams are equal on points on completion of the group matches, the following criteria are applied to determine the rankings:
superior goal difference from all group matches played;
higher number of goals scored from all group matches played;
lowest average team age in all group matches played. The average team age is determined by dividing the sum of the complete age years of all players fielded in all group matches by the total number of players fielded in all group matches.

Group A

Group B

Group C

Group D

Knockout phase
In the knockout phase, the four third-round group winners will contest a one-legged semi-final match for a place in the competition final.

Semi-finals
The semi-final pairings were made during the draw for the third round, on 20 November 2013. Matches took place on 13 February and 27 April 2014.

Final

Statistics

Top goalscorers

Last update: 26 January 2014

Notes

References

External links
 Official webpage 

Taca da Liga
Taca da Liga
Taça da Liga
Taca da Liga